Sydney 'Spudda' Tate (13 February 1925 – 15 May 2015) was an Australian rules footballer who played for Geelong in the VFL. 

Tate was a wingman in Geelong's 1951 premiership side, his last year in the league. He could also play as a rover and was originally from the Victorian town of Yallourn.

References

External links

1925 births
2015 deaths
Australian rules footballers from Victoria (Australia)
Geelong Football Club players
Geelong Football Club Premiership players
English emigrants to Australia
VFL/AFL players born in England
One-time VFL/AFL Premiership players